Tomaszów Bolesławiecki  is a village in the administrative district of Gmina Warta Bolesławiecka, within Bolesławiec County, Lower Silesian Voivodeship, in south-western Poland.

The village has a population of 1,700.

References

Villages in Bolesławiec County